Sodium gluconate is a compound with formula NaC6H11O7. It is the sodium salt of gluconic acid.  Its E number is E576. Sodium gluconate is widely used in textile dyeing, printing and metal surface water treatment.  It is also used as a chelating agent, a steel surface cleaning agent, a cleaning agent for glass bottles, and as a chelating agent for cement, plating and alumina dyeing industries.  It is a white powder that is very soluble in water.

References

Gluconates
Organic sodium salts
E-number additives